The 1896 Rhode Island Rams football team represented the University of Rhode Island in the 1896 college football season. It was the second season in school history. Rhode Island finished the season with a record of 0–4.

Schedule

References

Rhode Island
Rhode Island Rams football seasons
College football winless seasons
Rhode Island Rams football